The president of French Polynesia has been the head of government of French Polynesia since 1984. Édouard Fritch has held the office since 2014.

List of presidents

See also

Politics of French Polynesia
Kingdom of Tahiti
List of monarchs of Tahiti
List of colonial and departmental heads of French Polynesia

External links

French Polynesia
Politics of French Polynesia
 
1984 establishments in French Polynesia